Joe Newland is an American politician and farmer currently serving as a Republican member of the Kansas House of Representatives, representing the 13th House District. He serves as the vice chair of the Kansas House Committee on Agriculture and Natural Resources Budget.

Newland was selected by Republican precinct committee members in July 2019 to fill the vacancy in the House of Representatives caused by the resignation of former Rep. Larry Hibbard. He was sworn in on August 12, 2019, and was reelected in 2020.

Newland and his wife are farmers in Neodesha, Kansas. He is a former member of the Kansas Farm Bureau board of directors.

References

Living people
Republican Party members of the Kansas House of Representatives
Farmers from Kansas
Year of birth missing (living people)
21st-century American politicians